Sybra pulla is a species of beetle in the family Cerambycidae. It was described by Breuning in 1939. It is known from Borneo and the Philippines.

References

pulla
Beetles described in 1939